"Aléjate de Mí" is a pop/rock ballad song by Mexican pop/rock group Camila released as the second single from their second studio album, Dejarte de Amar released officially on May 3, 2010, through Sony Music Latin. The song is also their third Mexican number-one single.

Background and release
The song is written and produced by Mario Domm. The song was released as the last promotional single, before to release the album on February 1, 2010, and later selected as second single. The music video was released on May 12, 2010, directed by Ricardo Calderón, was also released for sale on May 31, 2010. The song was used as the lead theme of the protagonists Pilar and Gonzalo in the Chilean TV series La familia de al lado aired by TVN (Chile) in 2010–2011.

Awards

Versions
Claudia Leitte recorded a live version of the song call "Afaste-se de mim" for her 2012 album Negalora: Íntimo.

Charts

Year-end charts

Certifications

Release history

See also
List of number-one songs of 2010 (Mexico)

References

External links

2010 singles
2010 songs
Camila (band) songs
Monitor Latino Top General number-one singles
Songs written by Mario Domm
Spanish-language songs
Pop ballads
Rock ballads
Sony Music Latin singles